Song and Silence: A Guidebook to Rogues and Bards is an optional rulebook for the 3rd edition of Dungeons & Dragons, and notable for its trade paperback format.

Contents
The Song and Silence guidebook provides supplemental information for characters belonging to the Rogue and Bard base classes. This book contained tips for creating and playing characters of the aforementioned class, as well as a large number of prestige classes.

Publication history
This book was written by David Noonan and John D. Rateliff and published in 2001 by Wizards of the Coast. Cover art was by Todd Lockwood, with interior art by David Roach and Wayne Reynolds.

Although it was not updated to 3.5 Edition, most of the prestige classes were reintroduced in the 3.5 supplemental source book Complete Adventurer, and a few in Complete Arcane.

Reception
The reviewer from Pyramid noted the prestige classes in the book, and felt that it offered "some jim-dandies in this one", including the thief-acrobat, and the Fang of Lolth, "which starts with the assumption that a PC tries to access an artifact not meant for humanoids with a Use Magic Device roll. Hijinks ensue." The reviewer continued: "The rest of the prestige classes, while they are interesting and fulfill crucial roles, do not make stretch the genre my motor run and the way that the Fang of Lolth does. Yes, the crime-fighting Vigilante, the Robin Hood-ish Outlaw of the Crimson Road, and the swashbuckly Dread Pirate do exactly what a prestige class is meant to do: help to define a setting."

See also
Defenders of the Faith
Masters of the Wild
Sword and Fist
Tome and Blood

References

External links
Product page at wizards.com

Handbooks and manuals